Palmillas is a historical town and municipal seat of Palmillas Municipality in Southwest Tamaulipas, Mexico. It has about five small towns including its township of the same name. There is only one church, which is very old. According to the INEGI census in 2005, the Palmillas municipality has a total of 1,603 inhabitants. Palmillas is the municipal seat for the surrounding ejidos in the area. The Catholic Church, located beside the main plaza and is Called "The Church Of Our Lady Of The Snows", is reported to be the oldest operational Catholic church in Tamaulipas.

History
The establishment of the Mission Palmillas was ordered by the King Felipe IV. Palmillas was founded by Colonel Martín de Zavala in 1627. The Mission was also known as Real de Palmillas. In 1747 Real de Palmillas was rechartered as villa.

Geography
The municipality has a land area of mi). Mountains and hills cover 92% of its landscape.

References

Traditional Native American dwellings